James Clay may refer to:

 James Clay (author) (1804–1873), English MP and writer about the game of whist
 James Clay (musician) (1935–1994), saxophonist and flautist
 James Clay (Pennsylvania politician), member of the Pennsylvania House of Representatives
 James Brown Clay (1817–1864), United States Representative from Kentucky
 James Franklin Clay (1840–1921), United States Representative from Kentucky
 Jim Clay (production designer), RDI-awarded production designer
 James Clay, a pseudonym used by Phil Foglio (born 1956), cartoonist and comic book artist